The University of the Sunshine Coast (UniSC) is a public university based on the Sunshine Coast, Queensland, Australia. After opening with 524 students in 1996 as the Sunshine Coast University College, it was later renamed the University of the Sunshine Coast in 1999.

The university has a flagship campus at Sippy Downs on the Sunshine Coast, with more campuses at Hervey Bay on the Fraser Coast, Gympie, and Caboolture. In 2020, USC opened a full-service campus at Petrie in Moreton Bay.

Undergraduate and postgraduate (coursework and higher degree by research) programs are available, with study areas divided into seven disciplines: business, IT and tourism; creative industries, design and communication; education; engineering and science; health, nursing and sport sciences; humanities, psychology and social sciences; and law and criminology.

The university is listed on the Commonwealth Register of Institutions and Courses for Overseas Students.

In the 2020 Student Experience Survey, UniSC was ranked within the top five universities in Australia for teaching quality, and in the top six for the overall student experience.

History
The first discussions about a university for the Sunshine Coast region began in 1973. In 1989, the Australian Federal Government approved its establishment. On 1 July 1994 the Queensland Parliament passed the Sunshine Coast University College Act 1994.

The university was established in 1994, opening in 1996 as the Sunshine Coast University College. The University of the Sunshine Coast Act 1998 was passed in Queensland Parliament on 19 November of that year, legislating the independent status of the university. The university changed to its current name of the University of the Sunshine Coast (USC; UniSC from July 2022) in 1999. It was created by the Australian Government to serve the growing population of the Sunshine Coast region, north of Brisbane, in Queensland. The University of the Sunshine Coast is the first greenfield university established in Australia since 1971.

The inaugural vice-chancellor was Professor Paul Thomas, who took office with effect from 1 January 1996, having spent an earlier period as planning president. UniSC's second vice-chancellor, Professor Greg Hill AO, took over from Professor Thomas AM in 2011 after starting at the university in 2005 as deputy vice-chancellor. He stayed in the role until August 2020 when Professor Helen Bartlett joined as the university's third vice-chancellor.

Justice Gerald “Tony” Fitzgerald was the university's inaugural chancellor, followed by pastoralist Ian Kennedy, AO, who was UniSC's second chancellor. Air Chief Marshal Sir Angus Houston AK, AFC (Ret'd) became the university's fourth chancellor when he was appointed to the role in 2017 after John Dobson OAM retired from the position. Sir Angus remains the university's current chancellor.

The student body has grown consistently since the university opened in 1996 with an intake of 524 students. In 2020, UniSC had 18,150 students enrolled.

The university introduced paid parking at its Sippy Downs campus from February 2013, a move that garnered a negative response from some students and staff. Some of the parking has solar canopies, which along with campus roofs supply 2.1 MW of solar electricity (5 GWh/year). The power is also used to cool 4.5 million liters of water for air conditioning, estimated to save AU$100 million over 25 years.

Rankings

UniSC has consistently received high rankings from independent agencies for areas such as teaching quality and overall student experience.

In the Good Universities Guide, UniSC received five stars for teaching quality, marking 15 consecutive years the university received top marks in the category. The 2021 edition of the Guide also awarded UniSC five stars for overall student experience for the ninth consecutive year and learning resources for the fifth consecutive year. The 2021 edition also saw UniSC awarded five stars for skills development, social equity, and first generation.

In the Quality Indicators for Learning and Teaching's (QILT) 2020 Student Experience Survey, UniSC scored above the sector average in all six student experience areas. The university scored 80.9 percent for teaching quality, placing it in the top five universities in Australia for this ranking. For overall student experience, UniSC scored 73 percent, placing it in the top six for the focus area. For learning resources, UniSC scored 80.6 percent; for skills development, 79 percent; and for student, 78.9 percent.

Likewise, for the Employer Satisfaction Survey, UniSC scored above the national average in five of the six focus areas, including a 100 percent score for foundation skills, 90.3 percent for adaptability, 90.9 percent for collaboration, 96.8 percent for technical skills, 93.1 percent for employability, and 78.8 percent for overall satisfaction.

In 2007 the Australian Universities Quality Agency (AUQA) audited UniSC as part of their assessment of all Australian universities. AUQA is a national agency that operates independently of governments and the higher education sector. The report commended UniSC for "its significant achievements since inception" and awarded UniSC commendations for the quality of the university's learning and teaching, student support services, workplace integrated learning program and degree approval process. The Headstart Program – a program allowing Year 11 and 12 school students to study one or more courses at the university, while still completing secondary school – and Global Opportunities Program – the university's study abroad were also acknowledged in the assessment.

The university's Global Opportunities Program received an award from the Queensland government at the Celebrating International Education and Training Industry Showcase in August 2007 for promoting internationalisation.

In March 2008 the university was one of 99 organisations nationally and one of 10 in Queensland to earn an Employer of Choice for Women citation. The citations are awarded annually by the federal government's Equal Opportunity for Women in the Workplace Agency (EOWA). It has received the citation for six consecutive years to 2010.

Campus and locations 
Opening in 1996 as the Sunshine Coast University College, it was renamed the University of the Sunshine Coast. The Sippy Downs campus in Sippy Downs, Queensland is the university’s primary campus with 12,724 students in 2021. The site was previously a sugar cane farm, at the geographical heart of the Sunshine Coast and its shires, close to the Bruce Highway and other major transport routes.

The buildings on campus have received 30 awards for planning, architecture and construction. In 2000 the university received the Royal Australian Institute of Architects President's Award, and in 1997 the Library was awarded the Sir Zelman Cowen Award for Public Buildings.

All buildings on campus focus on environmentally sustainable design to suit the subtropical climate of the Sunshine Coast. Buildings have been designed for passive lighting and natural ventilation to minimise the use of non-renewable energy.

In 2007, the university opened three new buildings, the A$12 million science building, the A$13 million chancellery and the A$10 million indoor sports stadium. A year later, Federal Treasurer Wayne Swan opened the A$13 million Health and Sport Centre, which has testing and research laboratories, a gymnasium and public psychology clinic. Medical training is also carried out at the Sunshine Coast Health Institute (SCHI) and the Sunshine Coast University Hospital (SCUH).

In August 2010, construction started on a $5 million semi-industrial shared space facility for engineering and paramedic science students. This opened in May 2011 and has specialised equipment and large, open spaces suitable for medical emergency simulations and a wide variety of engineering tests and experiments. It also has several laboratories and tutorial rooms.

In November 2010, construction started on the university pool complex, which includes a 50m heated Olympic swimming pool for research and community use. The complex was officially opened on 19 October 2011, by Queensland Sport Minister Phil Reeves. Funding for the $2.1 million project was provided by the Queensland State Government, the university, community donations, and through in-kind support.

Art gallery

The University of the Sunshine Coast Gallery hosts a range of exhibitions focusing on contemporary art and design. The annual exhibition program includes:
new media (including computer-based design)
photography
painting, drawing and sculpture
illustration
student exhibitions

The gallery is in the heart of the university campus, with more than half of the annual attendance being educational visitors (UniSC students and staff, U3A, TAFE, primary and high school students).

In 2013, UniSC opened a Gympie campus before taking over a Fraser Coast campus from the University of Southern Queensland in 2016. The university also operates an education and research facility at Dilli Village on Fraser Island.

The university's geographical expansion continued in 2018 with the transfer of the Queensland University of Technology's Caboolture campus to UniSC's control.

The move into the region just north of Brisbane preceded UniSC's greenfield development of Moreton Bay's first full-scale university campus at Petrie, which opened in 2020.

University art and sculpture collection
Since its inception, the University of the Sunshine Coast has worked to develop an art collection focusing on contemporary Australian art with an emphasis on Queensland artists. Many of these works can be viewed throughout the university campus. The university collection includes several sculptures in public spaces on the campus.

The university's collection of contemporary Australian Art includes one of the most significant collections of Western and Central Desert Australian Aboriginal Art on the Sunshine Coast.

Netball stadium

The university features an indoor arena used often for Netball matches and other sporting activities. Since February 2017 the arena has been the home stadium for National Netball League team Sunshine Coast Lightning. The arena has a seating capacity of 2,200 and features broadcasting facilities and several corporate boxes. As a result of growing demand for the Lightning amongst the public, the venue was upgraded to 3,000 seats and also featured new change rooms, a function room, public bathrooms and an improved sound system; all of which was completed in May 2019.

Organisation
The University Council is the governing body with the chancellor presiding over council meetings. The council has 19 members including the chancellor drawn from the university staff, student body and wider community.

The academic board is the university's senior academic body. It advises the council concerning teaching, scholarship and research matters, formulates proposals for the academic policies of the university, monitors the academic activities of the university's faculties, and promotes and encourages scholarship and research at the university.

Research 
The University of the Sunshine Coast's research focus is on regional engagement and sustainability issues. In 2009, research efforts concentrated on applied genetics in primary production, regional sustainability and the health professions. The university has two core research groups; the GeneCology Research Group and the Sustainability Research Centre and an engagement centre, the Centre for Healthy Activities, Sport and Exercise.

The UniSC Research Bank provides open access to the University of the Sunshine Coast's research output. The database ensures the research output of the university is accessible to local, national and international communities.

The university's research centres actively seek grants and funding, with the Sustainability Research Centre securing more than $2 million in funding in 2008, leading to the submission of more than 100 research papers. $1.3 million of that funding was drawn from the CSIRO's Collaborative Fund. In May 2009, a separate research team secured an AUSAID grant worth more than $500,000.

In June 2011 the university was announced as one of 12 projects to receive Australian government funding under the Collaborative Research Networks (CRN) program. In the period 2011 to 2014 the university will receive $5.45 million to fund research in water, sustainability, forestry and aquaculture.

Australian Research Council grants 
The university received two Australian Research Council Discovery grants, worth more than $1 million, in the 2012 funding round announced in November 2011:
 Scott Cummins was awarded a $656,377 ARC Future Fellowship for his study of primordial germ cell migration in perciform fish, titled: "Decoding the rules of fate, attraction and cell migration in perciform fish". The ARC grant will be coupled with Dr Cummins' ARC Discovery Project Grant for $145,000 over 2012 to 2014 for research into snail hypometabolism, enabling him to build a significant team of researchers conducting world-class research in the field of the biological sciences.
 Roland De Marco, Pro Vice-Chancellor for Research and joint chief investigator in a project called “New mesoporous materials for use in high temperature proton exchange fuel cell membranes”, gained a three-year ARC Discovery Project grant of $420,000, with $40,000 each year going to support a PhD student at the university. The research involves using synchrotron radiation techniques to develop innovative fuel cell materials with the potential to provide high energy and high stability alcohol fuel cells.

Other 2011 ARC funding:
 Kate Mounsey won a $375,000 competitive grant for research into the contagious skin infection, scabies, titled: "A porcine model to provide new insights on scabies immunopathology". Her study was one of 277 projects selected from 2,159 applications nationally for funding under the ARC's new Discovery Early Career Researcher Award (DECRA) scheme. The ARC grant will be coupled with Dr Mounsey's award of a National Health and Medical Research Council (NHMRC) Project grant of $483,510 (in collaboration with UniSC's Associate Professor Shelley Walton) on a related project over the same timeframe.
 The university was announced as a partner in three successful ARC Linkage Infrastructure Equipment and Facilities grants, involving Cummins (via the University of Queensland), De Marco (via Curtin University) and Senior Lecturer in Environmental Microbiology, Ipek Kurtboke (via the University of Queensland).

Centre for Healthy Activities, Sport and Exercise 
The Centre for Healthy Activities, Sport and Exercise (CHASE) undertakes research and related activities in preventative health and rehabilitation, and understanding and enhancing sports performance. Projects include consultancies and tenders, conducting short courses and conferences and contributing to policy debate in areas such as biomechanical assessment, physiological profiling, sports coach education, and the implementation of healthy programs.

GeneCology Research Center 
The GeneCology Research Center operates in the areas of genetics, ecology, genomics and physiology and the interaction between these. The research group researches sustainable production of aquaculture, horticulture and forestry systems, biodiversity conservation and sustainable urban forestry and horticulture.

In 2009, Professor in Aquaculture Biotechnology Abigail Elizur and associate professor in Aquaculture Genetics Wayne Knibb were involved in a project that resulted in the first-ever captive spawning of Southern Bluefin Tuna. The project was voted the second most important innovation of the year by Time, behind NASA's Ares rocket.

Sustainability Research Centre 
The Sustainability Research Centre focuses on sustainable communities and sustainable environments, and the institutions that relate to them. The research focus is based around coastal management, climate change, water management, natural and cultural heritage, innovation, adaptive growth, and community wellbeing.

University-based organisations 
The University of the Sunshine Coast has one subsidiary company – Innovation Centre Sunshine Coast Pty Ltd. At the northern end of the campus, this is the first stage of a planned technology park precinct for Sippy Downs. The Innovation Centre comprises a business incubator for start-up technology businesses and a business accelerator for established technology, knowledge-based, and professional service firms.

The Innovation Centre provides serviced office space, high speed optical fibre Internet connection, business development coaching and support. As of July 2010, the Innovation Centre has supported the start-up and growth of around 80 businesses, mainly in ICT, cleantech and creative industry sectors.

Notable people 

The current chancellor of the university is Air Chief Marshall Sir Angus Houston, a retired senior officer of the Royal Australian Air Force.

Student accommodation 
Three student accommodation complexes are next to the campus in Chancellor Park. Varsity Apartments, UniCentral and The Village are privately owned and operated. All are within walking distance of the campus, linked by pedestrian pathways.

Each accommodation complex has furnished apartments, some with Internet connection. The general layout in an apartment is a shared kitchen and living room, with four single bedrooms, each with its own bathroom and toilet. The complexes are gated and have barbecues, pools and outdoor sports courts (such as tennis/basketball and volleyball). Many of these units are shared units, however each student has his/her own bedroom and bathroom, only sharing the main living spaces. Many complexes also mix the residents between local and international students for a well engaged cross cultural experience.

Public transport
University of the Sunshine Coast is serviced by TransLink bus routes, operated by Sunbus. Services depart to Caloundra, Nambour, Maroochydore and Kawana, with connecting services to Noosa at Maroochydore's Sunshine Plaza interchange, and connecting to rail services at Landsborough Station. Services enter and depart from the new bus station via the Green Link.

See also

List of universities in Australia

References

External links 

Universities Australia
Innovation Centre Sunshine Coast

 
Buildings and structures on the Sunshine Coast, Queensland
Buderim
Educational institutions established in 1998
1998 establishments in Australia
Schools in Queensland